Rameez Junaid and Simon Stadler are the defending champions, but the latter decided not to compete this year thus Junaid is playing alongside Jesse Huta Galung.

Antal van der Duim and Boy Westerhof won the title, defeating Simon Greul and Wesley Koolhof in the final, 4–6, 6–3, [12–10].

Seeds

  Jesse Huta Galung /  Rameez Junaid (semifinals)
  Thiemo de Bakker /  Stephan Fransen (semifinals)
  Gero Kretschmer /  Alexander Satschko (quarterfinals)
  Andreas Beck /  Dominik Meffert (first round)

Draw

Draw

References
 Main Draw

TEAN International - Doubles
2013 Doubles
2013 in Dutch tennis